Lawrence Rothman (born June 19, 1982) is an American singer-songwriter based in Los Angeles. Their debut album The Book of Law was released on October 13, 2017 via Downtown Records/Interscope. The album was produced by Rothman and Justin Raisen (Charli XCX, Sky Ferreira), and features contributions from Angel Olsen, Kim Gordon, Marissa Nadler, Charli XCX, Kristin Kontrol, Duff McKagan of Guns N’ Roses, among others. Rothman has toured North America with Marissa Nadler, Cass Mccombs, Spoon, Rhye, Twin Shadow, Little Dragon and Tei Shi, and internationally with Iggy Pop, Active Child, Majical Cloudz, and Jennylee (Warpaint). As a producer and songwriter, Rothman has worked with Angel Olsen, SASAMI, Girl in Red, Kali Uchis, Alison Mosshart, Marissa Nadler, Kim Gordon, Courtney Love, Lucinda Williams, Amanda Shires, and more.

Biography

Early life 
Rothman was born and raised in a middle class area of St. Louis, Missouri. They are Jewish. From a young age, Rothman identified as gender-fluid, wearing makeup and presenting in an androgynous style. Rothman was homeschooled until second grade and was bullied after entering the public school system.

From the age of 13, Rothman formed a number of punk, alternative rock and hip-hop bands, and toured throughout the United States. During this period, Rothman was physically assaulted by three off-duty National Guardsmen after performing a club in Texas. At 17, they left home and moved to Chicago with no support from their parents. Living with a cousin, Rothman encountered artists and musicians who helped them come to terms with their non-binary identity. From 2002 to 2011, Rothman fronted the punk rock band Living Things under the name Lillian Berlin.

2013–2014: Early singles 
After moving to Los Angeles, Rothman began writing music under their own name and signed to Mamaroma, the independent label founded by renowned director Floria Sigismondi, known for her music videos for David Bowie, Marilyn Manson, and Fiona Apple and for TV work including The Handmaid's Tale and American Gods. In June 2013, Rothman released their debut single, "Montauk Fling", with an accompanying video directed by Sigismondi.  This marked the start of a long-term creative collaboration between the two – Sigismondi has since directed all of Rothman's music videos to date. Throughout 2013, Rothman released subsequent singles on Mamaroma: “#1 All Time Low”, “Kevin”, and “Fatal Attraction”. These saw a largely positive response from press outlets including The Huffington Post, The Guardian, and Stereogum.

2015–2017: The Book of Law 
In 2014, Rothman signed to Downtown Records and began work on their debut album, The Book of Law, with producer Justin Raisen. Rothman came up with a list of dream collaborators, including Duff McKagan from Guns N' Roses, Kim Gordon, Angel Olsen, and Nick Zinner from the Yeah Yeah Yeahs, whom Raisen brought into their studio. The two used Rothman's journals as the basis for the lyrics and emotional mood of the record. In an interview with The FADER, Rothman stated that the recording process was fraught and dramatic, with “drug ODs [from others in the camp], fist fights, jail, police getting called on [Raisen] by record companies, threatening to cut a guy's neck off on Thanksgiving".

2021: Good Morning, America and Not a Son 
In October 2020, Rothman announced sophomore album "Good Morning, America" and spoken word counterpart album "Not a Son". The first single was "Decent Man" a duet with Grammy award winning singer songwriter Lucinda Williams. The song a politically charged statement on 2020 America was Written and Produced By Lawrence Rothman. "Good Morning America" was released on July 16, 2021. Guest included Lucinda Williams, Amanda Shires, Katie Pruitt, Marissa Nadler, Caroline Rose, Mary Lattimore, Pino Palladino, and Girlpool. On Oct 10, 2021 "Not A Son" Rothman's spoken word poetry album was released featuring members of Thundercats band harpist Mary Lattimore and guitarist Nick Zinner of the Yeah Yeah Yeahs.

Career 
Along with Rothman's music career they produced and mixed albums by Amanda Shires "Take It Like A Man", Highwomen "Highway Unicorn" from Lady Gaga "Born This Way 10th Anniversary", Marissa Nadler "For My Crimes" additional production on Angel Olsen "My Woman" as well as acting with their first role in Drake Doremus' Endings, Beginnings, premiering at the 2019 Toronto International Film Festival. Rothman's song "Wolves Still Cry" was featured in season 2 Episode 1 of Netflix original series 13 Reasons Why that song along with "Die Daily" were featured in Endings, Beginnings and "H" in Lucifer season 1 finale episode. In November 2019 it was announced that Rothman produced and wrote the soundtrack for DreamWorks Pictures The Turning. The soundtrack out on Rothman's record label KRO featured artist such as Courtney Love, Mitski, Soccer Mommy, Kim Gordon, Warpaint, and Finn Wolfhard. Rothman wrote and produced the first single performed by Courtney Love, "Mother". Their own track "SkinDeepSkyHighHeartWide" featured Pale Waves and their track "Judas Kiss' featured MUNA. Rothman authored a book Postmortem Bliss, which was turned into a short film for Tuner Classics in 2006.

KRO Records 
In 2019, Rothman launched their own record label, KRO Records, with Justin Raisen, Yves Rothman. KRO’s first release included two tracks from River Phoenix's band, Aleka's Attic, along with a single from Rain Phoenix featuring Michael Stipe. This was followed by a Double A-Side Single, "Poison" by Marissa Nadler feat. John Cale of The Velvet Underground. Other releases in 2019 included Kills Birds’ self-titled debut LP, Buzzy Lee’s (Sasha Spielberg) EP, “Close Encounters of Our Own Kind”, and a single titled “Mother” by Courtney Love. In 2020, KRO Records released Steven Spielberg produced "The Turning" soundtrack under exclusive license to Sony Music Entertainment. The film's soundtrack features tracks from Mitski, Kali Uchis, Soccer Mommy, Cherry Glazerr, Finn Wolfhard & Courtney Love. Rothman was the film's music supervisor and producer of the soundtrack.

Composing and scoring 
In 2010, Rothman scored The Runaways, a biopic film on the Joan Jett fronted female rock band The Runaways, starring Kristen Stewart and Dakota Fanning. In 2017, Rothman scored the News Emmy nominated New York Times Great Performers 2017 series short films starring Nicole Kidman, Timothy Chalamet, Saoirse Ronan, Jake Gyllenhaal and more. In 2018, Rothman scored a short film on the life of occult filmmaker Kenneth Anger for Gucci and Systems Magazine. Additionally, Rothman has scored short films for Levis, Prada, BMW, MAC Cosmetics and Alexander McQueen.

Discography

Albums 
Montauk Fling EP (2013)
Songs for Others EP (2013)
Alters EP (2014)
The Book of Law (2017)
I Know I've Been Wrong, But Can We Talk EP (2018)
Good Morning America (2021)
Not A Son (2021)

Singles 
"Montauk Fling" (2013)
"#1 All Time Low" (2013)
"Kevin" (2013)
"Fatal Attraction" (2013)
"California Paranoia" feat. Angel Olsen (2015)
"Oz vs. Eden" (2015)
"Users" (2015)
"H" (2016)
"Designer Babies" feat. Kim Gordon (2016)
"Wolves Still Cry" (2017)
"Ain't Afraid of Dying" feat. Marissa Nadler (2017)
"Jordan" feat. Kristin Kontrol (2017)
"Stand By" (2017)
"Decade" (2018)
"Oath" (2018)
"SkinDeepSkyHighHeartWide" feat. Pale Waves (2020)
"It's Hard to Be Human" feat. Marissa Nadler and Mary Lattimore (2020)
"Decent Man" feat. Lucinda Williams (2020)
"Thrash The West" feat. Amanda Shires (2021)
"Breathe" feat. Caroline Rose (2021)
"Not A Son" (2021)

Music videos 
Montauk Fling (2013)
#1 All Time Low (2013)
Fatal Attraction (2013)
California Paranoia feat. Angel Olsen (2015)
Oz vs. Eden (2015)
Users (2015)
H (2016)
Designer Babies feat. Kim Gordon (2017)
Wolves Still Cry (2017)
Ain't Afraid of Dying feat. Marissa Nadler (2017)
Jordan feat. Kristin Kontrol (2017)
Stand By (2017)
Decade (2018)Oath (2018)Decent Man feat. Lucinda Williams (2020)Thrash The West feat. Amanda Shires (2021)The Fix (2021)Glory feat.Katy Pruitt (2021)Homesiick (2021)GirlWhoLivedToSleep (2021)Health Card I.D.'' (2021)

Producer and songwriter discography

References

External links
 

Living people
1982 births
Non-binary musicians
LGBT Jews
Jewish American musicians
Downtown Records artists
Interscope Records artists
Musicians from St. Louis
Record producers from Missouri
American audio engineers
American film score composers
LGBT people from Missouri
Singer-songwriters from Missouri
Genderfluid people